is a train station in the city of Matsumoto, Nagano Prefecture, Japan, operated by East Japan Railway Company (JR East), and the private railway operator Alpico Kōtsū.

Lines
Matsumoto Station is served by the Shinonoi Line and is 13.3 kilometers from the terminus of the line at Shiojiri Station. It is also a terminal station for the  Ōito Line.  Chūō Main Line trains using the Shinonoi Line tracks also pass through Matsumoto. Matsumoto is also a terminus for the 14.4 kilometer private Kamikōchi Line operated by Alpico Kōtsū.

Station layout
The JR-East station consists of a three ground-level island platforms, connected to the station building by an elevated station building. The Alpico Kōtsū portion of the station has a single island platform, connected to the JR portion of the station by a footbridge. The station has a Midori no Madoguchi staffed ticket office.

Platforms

History
Matsumoto Station opened on 15 June 1902. With the privatization of Japanese National Railways (JNR) on 1 April 1987, the station came under the control of JR East.

Passenger statistics
In fiscal 2015, the JR East portion of the station was used by an average of 16,303 passengers daily (boarding passengers only).

Surrounding area
Matsumoto City Hall

See also
 Matsumoto Bus Terminal
 List of railway stations in Japan

References

External links

 JR East Matsumoto Station
Alpico Kōtsū station information

Railway stations in Japan opened in 1902
Railway stations in Matsumoto City
Stations of East Japan Railway Company
Shinonoi Line
Ōito Line
Matsumoto, Nagano